Chakhansur is a district in the Nimruz Province of Afghanistan. It has a population of about 11,165 as of 2004, which includes Pashtun, Tajik, Baloch and Hazara ethnic groups.

The economy is primarily based on agriculture, and the necessary water for irrigation is dependent on the status of the Sistan Basin, an endorheic basin which periodically becomes dry.

This area of  Afghanistan was a major medieval cultural hub on the Silk Road but most ancient structures are  now covered by sand.  Signs of historical irrigation systems, including canals, are still visible in the Chakhansur area while elsewhere canals are filled with silt and agricultural fields buried by shifting sand. Today the area is relatively sparsely populated. There continue to be problems with water control and periodic flooding and drought.

In 2004 the Chakhansur farmers had been experiencing a severe and long term drought. Even with help from the World Food Program, many have abandoned their homes, perhaps as many as 20,000, to search for water and jobs.

See also 
 Chakhansur

Footnotes

External links 
 Satellite view of Chakhansur
 Shows Chakhansur proximity to Sistan Basin
 Dust storm over Afghanistan and Pakistan
 From Wetland to Wasteland: The Destruction of the Hanoum Oasis

Districts of Nimruz Province